Woodlawn School may refer to:

Woodlawn School Building (Woodlawn, Arkansas), listed on the National Register of Historic Places (NRHP)
Woodlawn School (Mebane, North Carolina), NRHP-listed  
Woodlawn School (Mooresville, North Carolina), founded 2002

See also
Woodlawn High School (disambiguation)